Persipu FC is an Indonesian association football club based in Depok, West Java. They currently compete in the Liga 3. They founded in 2008 by Andrew Baskoro who has acquired a football club from Bandung named Tiki Taka, which is owned by his friend.

History 
Persipu is a football team that was founded in 2008, which was originally intended as a gathering place for fellow professional football players, during their holidays they compete in the Indonesian league with their respective clubs.

On the basis of the purpose of gathering and staying in touch, initially Persipu's activities were limited to holding friendly matches during the holidays. Over time, Persipu has regenerated with the addition of members, the majority of whom are young footballers.

As a result, the forum which was previously shown as a casual gathering place for senior footballers, slowly turned into a coaching program for young footballers who are looking for a stepping stone for them to penetrate the professional level. Tiki Taka, and changed its name to Persipu. Thus, Persipu officially became an Indonesian league team as of mid 2017.

References

External links 

Depok
Football clubs in Indonesia
Football clubs in West Java
Association football clubs established in 2008
2008 establishments in Indonesia